Tiedong Road Subdistrict is a subdistrict situated within Hebei District, Tianjin, China. It borders Tianmu Town and Pudong Subdistrict in its northwest, Yixingbu Town and Jianchang Avenue Subdistrict in its east, Ningyuan and Hongshunli Subdistricts in its south, and Xinkaihe Subdistrict in its west. As of the 2010 census, the subdistrict had 73,722 residents under its administration.

This subdistrict was created in 1990, and it was named after Tiedong Road that runs through it.

Geography 
Tiedong Road subdistrict is situated on the northern bank of Xinkai River.

Administrative divisions 
At the time of writing, Tiedong Road Subdistrict is formed from 12 residential communities, all of which can be seen in the list below:

Gallery

References 

Township-level divisions of Tianjin
Hebei District, Tianjin